Maranta is a genus of flowering plants in the family Marantaceae, native to tropical Central and South America and the West Indies. Maranta was named for Bartolomeo Maranta, an Italian physician and botanist of the sixteenth century.

About 40-50 species are currently recognized. They all have rhizomes and naturally form perennial clumps. The crowded oval, evergreen leaves are undivided with sheathing stalks. The leaves are flat by day and folded up as the day comes to an end, hence the common name "prayer plant" which attaches to the genus and its species - notably M. leuconeura. The flowers are small with three petals and two larger petal-like staminodes.

Cultivation
Maranta arundinacea is cultivated to produce the edible starch arrowroot. Some species such as Maranta leuconeura (prayer plant) and M. arundinacea are grown as common houseplants in a warmish house or conservatory environment. They can be propagated through cuttings (2 - 3 leaves) or by root division.

Species
Species include:

References

External links

Production Guide

 
Zingiberales genera